Gexiangjie Station is a station of Line 3, Suzhou Rail Transit. The station is located in Suzhou Industrial Park, Jiangsu. It has been in use since December 25, 2019; when Line 3 first opened to the public.

References 

Railway stations in Jiangsu
Suzhou Rail Transit stations
Railway stations in China opened in 2019